The England cricket team toured South Africa during the 1999–2000 season, playing five Test matches and a triangular One Day International (ODI) series against South Africa and Zimbabwe. The tour became infamous, after Hansie Cronje later admitted he had been bribed to ensure a result in the fifth Test of the series.

Test series

1st Test

2nd Test

3rd Test

4th Test

5th Test

Standard Bank Triangular Tournament

2nd Match: South Africa v England

3rd Match: South Africa v England

4th Match: England v Zimbabwe

5th Match: England v Zimbabwe

7th Match: South Africa v England

9th Match: England v Zimbabwe

Final: South Africa v England

References

External links
Tour page at cricinfo.com

1999 in English cricket
1999 in South African cricket
2000 in English cricket
2000 in South African cricket
1999-2000
International cricket competitions from 1997–98 to 2000
South African cricket seasons from 1970–71 to 1999–2000